TX Piscium (19 Piscium) is a variable carbon star in the constellation Pisces.  It is amongst the reddest naked eye stars, with a significant reddish hue when seen in binoculars.   It is approximately 900 light years from Earth.

Spectrum
TX Piscium is a very red star, 2.6 magnitudes fainter at blue wavelengths than in the middle of the visual range, and another 3.3 magnitudes fainter in the ultraviolet.

It has been given a spectral class C7,2, indicating a relatively cool carbon star with only modest C2 band strength.  It has alternately been classified as C-N5 C24, suggesting a warmer star with stronger C2 bands.  Spectral features have been observed to vary.

Variability

The apparent magnitude of TX Piscium varies between +4.9 and +5.5 and it is classified as a slow irregular variable.  Photometry has shown some periodicity in the brightness of 224 days, and some spectral variation over 450 days, suggesting the star is not entirely irregular.

The star apparently lies on the period-luminosity relation corresponding to fundamental mode pulsations, unusual for a low-amplitude semi-regular or irregular variable which usually pulsate in an overtone.  The angular diameter has been measured at around 10 mas, although this varies depending on the observed wavelength and the atmosphere appears to be highly asymmetric.  There may be one or more "blobs" of ejected material near the star.  Some observations show the angular diameter to change in synchrony with the visual brightness.

Properties
TX Piscium is a thermally-pulsing asymptotic giant branch (TP-AGB) star, which means that it is alternately fusing helium in a shell around its core and fusing hydrogen in a shell closer to its surface.  Stars on the TP-AGB are generally unstable, with high mass loss and pulsations.

The periodic flashes of the helium shell in a TP-AGB star are known as thermal pulses and cause the hydrogen shell to be extinguished.  This creates strong convection and the third dredge-up (TDU) which brings helium fusion products such as carbon to the surface.  After several TDUs, the abundance of carbon in the atmosphere begins to exceed that of oxygen and then the star is known as a carbon star.  In TX Piscium, the carbon/oxygen ratio is calculated to be 1.03, which is at the low end of the scale of carbon stars.  It is thought to be a relatively new carbon star.

In particular, stars with a mass below  are not expected to become carbon stars.

The temperature of TX Piscium is thought to vary between 3,080 K at minimum visual brightness and 3,170 K at visual maximum. Many of its physical properties are uncertain due to uncertainty in its distance. The Hipparcos parallax corresponds to a distance of 275 parsecs, but other estimates give distances as high as 315 parsecs.

References

Pisces (constellation)
Slow irregular variables
Piscium, 019
Carbon stars
Asymptotic-giant-branch stars
Piscium, TX
Durchmusterung objects
117245
9004
223075